M125 may refer to:

 M125 bomblet
 M125 mortar carrier based on the M113 armored personnel carrier
 M123 and M125 10-ton 6x6 trucks
 M-125 (Michigan highway)
 M125 (New York City bus)
 Palm m125 personal digital assistant